Tony Spears (fourth ¼ 1965) is an English former professional rugby league footballer who played in the 1980s.

Background
Tony Spears' birth was registered in Wakefield district, West Riding of Yorkshire, England.

Playing career

County Cup Final appearances
Tony Spears played , i.e. number 5, in Castleford's 18-22 defeat by Hull Kingston Rovers in the 1985 Yorkshire County Cup Final during the 1985–86 season at Headingley Rugby Stadium, Leeds, on Sunday 27 October 1985.

Genealogical information
Tony Spears is the younger brother of Sandra Spears (birth registered during third ¼  in Pontefract district), and David Spears (birth registered during fourth ¼  in Pontefract district).

References

External links
Tony Spears Memory Box Search at archive.castigersheritage.com

1965 births
Living people
Castleford Tigers players
English rugby league players
Rugby league players from Wakefield
Rugby league wingers